Malmkrog is a 2020 internationally co-produced drama film directed by Cristi Puiu.
 
Set in turn-of-the-20th-century Transylvania, at the snowy hillside manor of a blithe aristocrat named Nikolai (Frédéric Schulz-Richard), the film follows for nearly the entirety of its 200 minutes a series of winding conversations between a group of bourgeois elite—among them a Russian general's wife (Diana Sakalauskaité), a devout young Christian girl (Marina Palii), a Franco-Russian nobleman (Ugo Broussot), and a middle-aged woman (Agathe Bosch) whose pessimistic worldview seems to embody the essence of Solovyov's book.

The conversations always return to a central topic: whether one should adopt a non-violent approach to the organisation of society (Tolstoy's attitude, which Solovyov abhorred), or approach the duty of fighting war in a fervently committed, Christian spirit.

It was shown in the Encounters section at the 70th Berlin International Film Festival, where it also won the Best Director Award.

Cast
 Frédéric Schulz-Richard as Nikolai
 Agathe Bosch as Madeleine
 Marina Palii as Olga
 Diana Sakalauskaité as Ingrida
 Ugo Broussot as Edouard
 István Téglás as István
 Zoe Puiu as Zoechka

References

External links
 

2020 films
2020 drama films
Romanian drama films
2020s Hungarian-language films
2020s French-language films
2020s Russian-language films
2020s German-language films
Films directed by Cristi Puiu
Films set in country houses
2020 multilingual films
Romanian multilingual films